Morphettville is a suburb of Adelaide, South Australia in the City of Marion.

The northern part of the suburb is bounded by the Glenelg tram line, and fully occupied by the Morphettville Racecourse (horseracing track). The tram barn storage and maintenance facility is across Morphett Road from the racecourse, in the neighbouring suburb of Glengowrie opening in October 1986. The southern part of the suburb is predominantly residential, with the Sturt River flowing through from south to northwest.

Both the suburb and the racecourse were named after Sir John Morphett MLC, a prominent early settler.

References

See also
List of Adelaide suburbs

Suburbs of Adelaide